Allister Nalder (born 4 May 1957) is a New Zealand weightlifter. He competed in the men's light heavyweight event at the 1984 Summer Olympics.

References

External links
 

1957 births
Living people
New Zealand male weightlifters
Olympic weightlifters of New Zealand
Weightlifters at the 1984 Summer Olympics
People from Tākaka
Weightlifters at the 1982 Commonwealth Games
Commonwealth Games competitors for New Zealand
20th-century New Zealand people
21st-century New Zealand people
Weightlifters at the 1986 Commonwealth Games
Weightlifters at the 1990 Commonwealth Games